Safir is a Danish female singer, musician, composer, writer and producer.

Safir is primarily known as a performing artist and from her debut album, Safirsongs. For a period of time she was also the drummer of Danish hip hop phenomenon White Chocolate.

Before Safir started performing as a musician, she worked as a DJ at the radio stations Radio Olga and Radio Næstved. Here she was hosting several popular weekly programs. Safir started playing drums at the age of 15 and began shortly after singing professionally in several constellations. This included e.g. her jazz quartet, big band, pop-bands etc.

In 2002 Safir took a PhD from the Rhythmic Conservatory in Copenhagen, Denmark, in voice. Safir has at times taught singing and music at different schools, including at the prestigious Danish boarding school Herlufsholm.

In 2008 Safir released the debut album Safirsongs on indie label Nefertiti Records in cooperation with Scandinavian distributor Gateway Music. Safir is now based in Los Angeles and performs, writes and records with different collaborators.

Discography
 Safir: Safirsongs. Nefertiti Records, 2008.

External links
Official website

Year of birth missing (living people)
Living people
Danish women singers